Pornhub is a Canadian-owned internet pornography website. It is one of several pornographic video-streaming websites owned by MindGeek. , Pornhub is the 13th-most-trafficked website in the world and the second-most-trafficked adult website after XVideos.

Pornhub was launched in Montreal, Canada, in 2007. Pornhub also has an office and servers in Limassol, Cyprus. In March 2010, the company was bought by MindGeek (known then as Manwin), which owns numerous other pornographic websites. The site is available internationally but has been blocked by some individual countries such as India, mainland China, the Philippines, Pakistan and Sri Lanka. It offers virtual reality porn, amongst other products, and hosts the Pornhub Awards annually.

Incidents have been reported of Pornhub hosting non-consensual pornography. The company has been criticized for slow or inadequate responses to some of these incidents, including the hosting of the high-profile channel GirlsDoPorn, which was closed in 2019 following a lawsuit and charges of sex trafficking. In December 2020, following a New York Times article on such content, payment processors Mastercard and Visa cut their services to Pornhub. On 14 December 2020, Pornhub removed all videos by unverified users. This reduced the content from 13million to 4million videos.

History 
Pornhub was founded by web developer Matt Keezer as a website within the company Interhub, and launched on 25 May 2007. In March 2010, the company was purchased by Fabian Thylmann as part of the Manwin conglomerate, now known as MindGeek. In 2013, Thylmann sold his stake in the company to senior management – Feras Antoon and David Tassillo. As part of MindGeek, Pornhub makes up one of several pornographic websites in the company's "Pornhub Network", alongside YouPorn, RedTube, and others. Though not the most popular pornographic website, Pornhub is the single largest such website on the internet, hosting more videos than any similar site.

The website allows visitors to view pornographic videos from a number of categories, including professional and amateur pornography. Users can share videos on social media websites and leave "like" or "dislike" votes. Users may also optionally register a free Pornhub account, which additionally allows them to post comments, download videos and add videos to their favourites, as well as upload videos themselves. Videos can be flagged if they contain content which violates the website's terms of service.

In an effort to introduce quality curation to the site, the company launched a service called "Pornhub Select" in October 2013. Pornhub also launched a content curation website on 9 October 2013 called "PornIQ", which uses an algorithm to create personalized video playlists for the viewer based on a number of factors, including their porn preferences, the time of day they're visiting the website, what part of the world they live in and the amount of time the viewer has to watch the video(s). David Holmes of PandoDaily noted that Pornhub's data-intensive approach to playlists set it apart from previous attempts at user-generated playlists, and marked a new trend in the switch from content searching to passive curation among Web 2.0 websites.

As of 2009, three of the largest pornographic sites "RedTube, YouPorn and PornHub—collectively make up 100 million unique visitors".

In June 2015, Pornhub announced that it was going to make a pornographic film featuring real-life sex in space, named Sexplorations. The site hoped to launch the mission and shoot the movie in 2016, covering the pre- and post-production costs itself but seeking $3.4 million from IndieGogo crowdfunders. If funded, the film would have been slated for a 2016 release, following six months of training for the two performers and six-person crew.

On 1 February 2016, Pornhub launched an online casino, powered by Betsoft, Endorphina and 1x2 gaming software.

In October 2017, vice president Corey Price announced that Pornhub would use computer vision and artificial intelligence software to identify and tag videos on the website with information about the performers and sex acts. Price said the company planned to scan its entire library beginning in early 2018.

On 17 April 2018, the site began accepting Verge cryptocurrency as a payment option.

In December 2020, following a column in The New York Times by Nicholas Kristof that was critical of the company, payment processors Mastercard and Visa cut their services to Pornhub. Pornhub then removed all videos by unverified users.

Non-consensual pornography 

Pornhub employs Vobile to search for uploads of banned videos to remove them from the site, and non-consensual content or personally identifiable information present on Pornhub can be reported to the company via an online form. Pornhub has been criticized for its response to non-consensual pornography and sex trafficking. Journalists at Vice commented that Pornhub profits from "content that's destroyed lives, and continues to do harm". Slate said that the move reflected a larger trend of Internet platforms using verification to classify sources.

In 2009, a 14-year-old girl was gang raped at knifepoint and claims the videos were uploaded to Pornhub. The girl stated that she emailed Pornhub repeatedly over a period of six months, but received no reply. After she impersonated a lawyer, the videos were removed. Another case in October 2019 involved a man who faces charges of lewd and lascivious battery of a 15-year-old girl, videos of which were discovered on Pornhub, Modelhub, Periscope, and Snapchat that led to his arrest. The UK based activist group Not Your Porn was founded by the friend of a woman whose iCloud storage had been hacked, leading to the hacker posting sexually explicit photos and videos on Pornhub alongside her full name. Pornhub removed the video when reported, but clones of the video using her full name replicated faster than the videos were removed. The woman found that "the fractured communication system at Pornhub has meant this has become an increasingly excruciating process". The founder of Not Your Porn reported that fifty women contacted her over a six-month period about non-consensual online pornography featuring them, thirty of whom reported that the videos were uploaded to Pornhub.

In 2019, the official GirlsDoPorn channel, verified by Pornhub, was removed from the site. It was the 20th-largest channel on the website. On 10 October 2019, the two owners of GirlsDoPorn along with two employees were arrested on three counts of sex trafficking by force, fraud, and coercion, after a civil lawsuit filed in July. The channel was removed a week afterwards, which journalists at Daily Dot and Motherboard said was a slow response to the incident. Additionally, the videos could still be found afterwards unofficially on Pornhub's website.

The Internet Watch Foundation (IWF) found 118 instances of child sexual abuse material on Pornhub between 2017 and 2019. Pornhub rapidly removed this content. An IWF spokesperson said that other social networks and communication tools posed more of an issue than Pornhub in regard to this type of content. In 2020, the National Center for Missing & Exploited Children reported that over 20 million reports of child sexual abuse material related to content on Facebook, accounting for 95% of total reports, and that Pornhub and other MindGeek sites were the subject of only 13,000 reports.

In response to abusive content on the site, an online petition calling for the shutdown of Pornhub gained over one million signatures throughout 2020. The petition was started by Laila Mickelwait, Director of Abolition at Exodus Cry, a Christian anti-trafficking and anti-sex work non-profit, and was addressed to the executives of MindGeek, the parent company of Pornhub. The petition notes numerous instances of non-consensual and child abuse material on the website, including a child trafficking victim who was made a "verified model" by the site. In response to the petition, Pornhub claimed they were committed to removing such material from the site.

In December 2020, Nicholas Kristof's opinion column in The New York Times described Pornhub as a company which "monetizes child rapes, revenge pornography, spy cam videos of women showering, racist and misogynist content, and footage of women being asphyxiated in plastic bags." In response to the column, Pornhub announced it would prevent video uploads from unverified users and would disable video downloads. Visa and Mastercard also announced they would review their financial ties to Pornhub. On 10 December 2020, Mastercard and Visa blocked use of their cards on Pornhub. Pornhub told the New York Times that these claims were "irresponsible and flagrantly untrue".

On 14 December 2020, Pornhub announced that all videos posted by unverified users had been removed from public access "pending verification and review". This reduced the number of videos on the website from 13million to 4million. In Brazil, according to Clayton Nunes, CEO of Brasileirinhas, the result of this action showed that the people who upload non-consensual pornography to Pornhub are the same people who upload pirated pornography.

In December 2020, MindGeek, Pornhub's parent company was sued in California for hosting non-consensual videos produced by GirlsDoPorn, which coerced women into appearing in their videos under false pretenses. In January 2021, a class action lawsuit making similar claims was launched in Montreal. The Canadian proposed class action sought $600million for anyone who had intimate photos and videos, some of which may have been taken when they were underage, shared on MindGeek's sites without their consent, since 2007. In June 2021, 34 women sued MindGeek in federal court in California, alleging that the company had exploited them and hosted and promoted videos that depicted rape, revenge porn, and child sexual abuse.

In the wake of these controversies, Vice has reported that individuals tied to far-right and Christian fundamentalist groups, which claim to be anti-trafficking and anti-pornography activists, have disseminated disinformation and made death threats towards Pornhub's staff and sex workers.

In 2023 a tool developed by Meta Platforms—Take It Down—was released. Participating platforms—including Pornhub—agree to remove non-consensual images or videos that users flag with the tool. Also participating are OnlyFans, Facebook, Yubo, and Instagram. The program relies on users uploading hashes of images and cannot identify edited versions of the image.

Non-pornographic content 
Pornhub users have often uploaded non-pornographic content to the site, including posts of Hollywood films (under the belief that copyright holders would be less likely to look for uploads on Pornhub than on a mainstream video sharing service such as YouTube), to monetize content deemed ineligible for monetization on YouTube, or as memes and jokes. These videos often have double entendre titles resembling porn films, such as a pirated recording of the musical Hamilton listed as "Revolutionary Boys Get Dirty on American Politics", a clip from the animated film Puss in Boots listed as "Hardcore Pussy Gets Wrecked", highlight compilations of esports events tagged as a "gangbang", and Ryan Creamer videos, which feature comedic videos with sexual titles.

In March 2020, Pornhub premiered Leilah Weinraub's documentary Shakedown, which chronicles a black lesbian strip club of the same name in Los Angeles. The film streamed on the service throughout March, before being released via Criterion Channel. Brand director Alex Klein stated that the film's premiere on Pornhub was part of "a larger general commitment Pornhub has to supporting the arts."

Copyright infringement claims 
In 2010, Mansef Inc. and Interhub, the then-owners of Pornhub, were sued by the copyright holding company of the pornographic film production company Pink Visual, Ventura Content, for the copyright infringement of 95 videos on websites, including Pornhub, Keezmovies, Extremetube, and Tube8. According to Ventura Content, the 45 videos were streamed "tens of millions of times" and they claimed the piracy threatened the "entire adult entertainment industry". The suit was settled in October 2010, with terms that remain confidential. The parties agreed that the site operators would implement digital fingerprint filtering on their sites. Porn 2.0 sites such as these are seen as posing notable competition for paid pornographic websites and traditional magazine and DVD-based pornography.

In July 2021, Pornhub launched Classic Nudes, an interactive guide of classic art from major institutions, as a means to help museums recover from the financial toll of the pandemic. However, The Louvre, Uffizi Gallery, and Museo del Prado sued Pornhub for copyright infringement, claiming that the museums had never "granted authorizations for the operation or use of the art."

Malvertising 

In 2014, researcher Conrad Longmore found that advertisements displayed by the sites contained malware programs, which install harmful files on users' machines without their permission. Longmore told the BBC that of pornography websites, Pornhub and XHamster pose the greatest threat.

In 2017, security firm Proofpoint discovered malicious ads running on the site that had the potential to install override software on users' PCs. The ads had been promoted on the site for over a year without intervention from Pornhub.

Products 
Pornhub features virtual reality videos that allow 360° viewing for premium customers. It can be used with the PlayStation VR, though videos need to be downloaded from a computer and transferred via USB.

In 2015, Pornhub announced a planned wearable device called the "Wankband"—a wristband that stores kinetic energy during male masturbation, and can then be used to charge devices.  Pornhub's website says that the product is in development.

VPNHub
In May 2018, Pornhub launched a VPN service known as VPNHub, a free service thats offers a paid ad-free version. VPNHub is operated out of Cyprus and was built with a partnership with US-based AppAtomic, with its servers located in the US. According to TechRadar, VPNHub operates on the StackPath server network.

VPNHub claims a no-logging policy, but this has been questioned by a reviewer based on their actual practices surrounding advertiser data.

Philanthropy 

Pornhub has hosted events and campaigns to raise awareness of breast cancer. The first of these events took place in New York City on 24 April 2012, with the introduction of the "Boob Bus", which offered free breast exams for passers-by, as well as teaching self-examination techniques to use at home. Pornhub hosted a "Save the Boobs!" campaign in August 2012. For every 30 videos viewed in Pornhub's "big tit" or "small tit" category in the month of October, the website offered to donate a penny to the Susan G. Komen Foundation. However, the Susan G. Komen Foundation rejected the offer, stating that they were not a partner of Pornhub, would not accept their donations and asked the company to stop using their name. A total of 74,146,928 video views were watched, equalling approximately $24,716 worth of donations, which Pornhub subsequently tripled to $75,000. Donations were split amongst several charities, including the Eileen Stein Jacoby Fund and Cancer Sucks Inc.

For Arbour Day 2014, Pornhub launched a weeklong environmental campaign called "Pornhub Gives America Wood", which started on 25 April 2014 and ended on 2 May 2014.

Pornhub Awards 

The inaugural Pornhub Awards was held on 6 September 2018 at the Belasco Theater in Los Angeles. Kanye West was creative director. At the event, West debuted the music video for his song, "I Love It". The second annual show was held at the Orpheum Theatre in Los Angeles on 11 October 2019 and Bad Bunny headlined the event. The third show was held online on 15 December 2020 and hosted by Asa Akira. The fourth show did away with a ceremony and announced winners on 23 March 2022.

Search trends 
Under the heading of Pornhub Insights, Pornhub regularly releases information extracted from its archive of searches: in what regions it is most used, female searches vis-à-vis male searches, the most popular search terms by year or area, variations in searches that parallel current events, and the like; in the first half of 2017, the top search term in the US was "hentai", and 37% of searchers for gay male porn are women. Every year, it releases a "Year In Review". Because of this it has been called "the Kinsey Report of our time". According to research by data scientist Seth Stephens-Davidowitz, 25% of female searches for heterosexual porn on Pornhub involved keywords searching for painful, humiliating, or non-consensual sex.

Pornhub have also reported on traffic trends and their relations to large events. Traffic was below usual levels during the solar eclipse of 21 August 2017. During the 2018 Hawaii false missile alert, web traffic to Pornhub in Hawaii fell by 77% (from typical Saturday figures) at 8:23am, after the alert was sent, and increased 48% above typical levels at 9:01am, after notification that the alert was erroneous.

During the COVID-19 pandemic, when Pornhub offered Pornhub Premium for free, worldwide traffic increased by 18.5%.

Blocks and bans 
In 2011, European broadband provider TalkTalk (formerly Tiscali) received some criticism because its internet filter failed to block Pornhub, for over a week. This was due to the issue of child internet safety.

In January 2013, The Huffington Post commented that CBS "refused to air a short commercial for adult-themed site Pornhub during the Super Bowl on Sunday ... . The 20-second spot, which features an older couple sitting on a park bench (that's really all that happens), includes no explicit content." It was rejected because the Federal Communications Commission could hold CBS liable for endorsing pornographic content, as it is illegal to air pornography on US television.

In September 2013, the website was blocked by the Great Firewall in China.

On 12 March 2014, Pornhub was blocked in Russia because one actress looked too young, leading some viewers to think she was a minor.

In September 2016, the site was blocked in Russia due to "spreading harmful information to children", and reinstated in April 2017 after specifying the age of users. The site requires Russian users to authenticate themselves via the social network VK.

In January 2017, the Government of the Philippines blocked internet users from accessing Pornhub and other pornography websites. The websites were blocked pursuant to Republic Act 9775 or the Anti-Child Pornography Law, which prohibits websites from hosting child pornography content.

In October 2018, the Uttarakhand High Court reinstated a ban on Pornhub in India but made it optional for ISPs to leave sites that are free of child pornography unblocked. In order to circumvent the ban, Pornhub established a mirror website at Pornhub.net.

In November 2020, the government of Thailand blocked Pornhub, amongst other pornography websites.

On September 3, 2022, Instagram banned the website's Instagram account indefinitely. It had 13 million followers and posted non-pornographic material. The ban was lobbied for by the National Center on Sexual Exploitation and others.

On December 16, 2022, Pornhub's YouTube account was taken down, only a few days after they were removed from TikTok.

In popular culture 
Pornhub makes a prominent appearance in many scenes of the 2013 American romantic comedy film Don Jon. Pornhub Vice President Cory Price explained that one of the film's producers approached the company in March 2012, seeking permission to use the Pornhub brand. Price reviewed the movie's script and granted them permission, going as far as helping them find clips to use in the movie from their content partners (e.g. Brazzers, Mofos, Digital Playground, and Twistys). Joseph Gordon-Levitt, director and actor in the film, edited the clips together into rapid-fire montages, also featured prominently in the film.

See also 
 Internet pornography
 List of chat websites
 List of most popular websites
 List of video hosting services
 Porn 2.0

Notes

References

Further reading

External links 

 

2007 establishments in Quebec
Canadian erotica and pornography websites
Companies based in Montreal
Cypriot erotica and pornography websites
Gratis pornography
Internet properties established in 2007
MindGeek
Multilingual websites
Pornhub Network
Internet censorship in India